Zenyatta is a champion racehorse.  The word in other contexts may refer to:

 Zenyatta (Overwatch), character in the 2016 video game
 Zenyatta Mondatta, the album by The Police that was the inspiration for the name of the horse